Pro Football Illustrated was an American sports magazine on professional American football. It was published from the 1940s into the 1970s.

History and profile
Pro Football Illustrated was established in 1941. The magazine was based in Morris, Illinois. It was among the first magazines to extensively cover professional football. From 1943 to 1948 the magazine selected an All-Pro team.

References

1941 establishments in the United States
1970s disestablishments in the United States
Annual magazines published in the United States
American football mass media
Defunct magazines published in the United States
Magazines established in 1941
Magazines with year of disestablishment missing
Sports magazines published in the United States
Magazines published in Illinois